Jake Clifford (born 2 January 1998) is an Australian professional rugby league footballer who plays as a  and  for Hull F.C. in the Super League.

He previously played for the North Queensland Cowboys and Newcastle Knights in the NRL.

Background
Clifford was born in Cairns, Queensland, Australia and was raised in Tully, Queensland and is of Italian descent.

He played his junior rugby league for the Tully Tigers, before being signed by the North Queensland Cowboys.

Playing career

Early career
In 2013, Clifford played for the Northern Pride's Cyril Connell Cup side. A year later, he captained the side in their Grand Final victory over Townsville. In 2015, he moved up to the Northern Pride's Mal Meninga Cup side before moving to Townsville in 2016, where he played for the Townsville Blackhawks' Mal Meninga Cup side. In 2017, he played for the North Queensland Cowboys NYC side and was named in the 2017 NYC Team of the Year. On 27 September, he was named the 2017 Dally M NYC Player of the Year at the Dally M awards.

2018
On 17 February, he played off the interchange in a pre-season loss to the Wests Tigers, scoring a try.

Clifford started the 2018 NRL season playing for North Queensland's Queensland Cup feeder side, the Northern Pride. On 16 April, he re-signed with the North Queensland club until the end of the 2020 NRL season. On 24 June, he was 18th man for the Queensland Residents side. On 11 July, he started at halfback for the Queensland U20 side, scoring two tries and being named Man of the Match in Queensland's first ever win.

In Round 19 of the 2018 NRL season, he made his NRL debut against St. George Illawarra.

On 29 August, he was named Intrust Super Cup Halfback of the Year and Rookie of the Year at the QRL Gala Awards night. On 13 September, he was named the Cowboys Rookie of the Year at the club's presentation ball.

On 6 October, Clifford earned his first senior representative honours, starting at five-eighth in the Prime Minister's XIII's 34–16 win over Papua New Guinea. A week later, on 13 October, Clifford captained the Junior Kangaroos to a 40–24 win over Junior Kiwis, being named Man of the Match.

2019
Clifford entered the 2019 pre-season in a battle with Te Maire Martin for the vacant halves spot left by the retirement of Johnathan Thurston. Despite scoring a hat-trick in a pre-season trial against the Gold Coast Titans, Clifford lost out to Martin and began the season playing for the Northern Pride. He made his season debut in a Round 3 loss to the Cronulla-Sutherland Sharks, playing five games before being dropped back to the Pride. Clifford returned to first grade in the Cowboys' Round 12 win over the Gold Coast Titans. In Round 13, he scored his first NRL points, kicking four goals in a 20–22 loss to the Manly-Warringah Sea Eagles.

In Round 17, he scored his first NRL try and kicked the game winning field goal in North Queensland's Round 17 win over the Sydney Roosters. In the Cowboys' Round 22 loss to the Newcastle Knights, Clifford suffered an ankle injury and missed the final three games of the season.

On 16 December, Clifford re-signed with North Queensland until the end of the 2021 NRL season.

2020
In February, Clifford was a member of the Cowboys' 2020 NRL Nines winning squad, scoring a try in their final win over the St George Illawarra Dragons. He began the 2020 season playing for the Northern Pride.

In Round 3, he returned to first grade, playing 10 games at halfback before being dropped by interim head coach Josh Hannay after a Round 12 loss to the Canberra Raiders. In Round 17, he was recalled to the side, scoring a try in North Queensland's win over the St George Illawarra Dragons. Clifford finished the season as North Queensland's halfback, scoring a try in their Round 20 win over the Brisbane Broncos.

In November, Clifford signed a two-year contract with the Newcastle Knights starting in 2022.

2021
On 29 May, after playing seven games with the North Queensland club, Clifford secured an early release to join Newcastle for the remainder of the 2021 NRL season.

He made his club debut in round 13 for Newcastle in a 40-4 loss against Parramatta.

2022
Clifford made a total of 12 appearances for Newcastle in the 2022 NRL season scoring two tries as the club finished 14th on the table.

On 27 October, Clifford signed a two-year deal to join English side Hull F.C. starting in 2023.

Achievements and accolades

Individual
North Queensland Cowboys Rookie of the Year: 2018 
Queensland Cup Rookie of the Year: 2018 
Queensland Cup Team of the Year: 2018 
Dally M NYC Player of the Year: 2017
NYC Team of the Year: 2017

Team
2020 NRL Nines: North Queensland Cowboys – Winners

Statistics

NRL
 Statistics are correct to the end of the 2020 season

References

External links

Newcastle Knights profile
NRL profile

1998 births
Living people
Australian people of Italian descent
Australian expatriate sportspeople in England
Australian rugby league players
Hull F.C. players
Junior Kangaroos players
Newcastle Knights players
North Queensland Cowboys players
Northern Pride RLFC players
Prime Minister's XIII players
Rugby league halfbacks
Rugby league five-eighths
Rugby league players from Cairns